Schröder, Münchmeyer, Hengst & Co. (also known as SMH) was a German investment bank and private bank based in Hamburg, Germany. The firm was acquired in 1997 by UBS and the brand was eliminated in 2001.

History
Schröder, Münchmeyer, Hengst was formed through the 1969 merger of three German banks: Schröder Gebrüder & Co., Münchmeyer & Co. and Friedrich Hengst & Co. (formerly known as Bank Siegmund Merzbach).

SMH ran into serious difficulties in 1983 when it found itself overexposed to loans made to affiliated companies in Luxembourg.  When one of the companies, a building machinery business, failed the entire firm failed.  The Deutsche Bundesbank and the German regulators brought together the bank's management and creditors to resolve the situation.  Under pressure from the German regulators, the creditors ultimately agreed to a number of extensions and forgave a portion of the debt while management sought to sell its assets.  SMH sold its investment banking and other profitable businesses to Lloyds Bank.

In 1997, SMH was acquired from Lloyds by Union Bank of Switzerland in order to further penetrate the German investment banking market as well as the market for wealthy private clients.

Initially it was intended that SMH would retain its own identity.  However, after the merger of Union Bank of Switzerland with Swiss Bank Corporation in 1998, the combined UBS began consolidating its diverse brands.  In 2001, the bank dropped the use of the Schroeder, Muenchmeyer brand and the SMH stallion disappeared from the German banking landscape.

References

Former investment banks
Defunct financial services companies
Financial services companies established in 1969
Banks established in 1969
UBS
Financial services companies disestablished in 2001
Banks disestablished in 2001
1969 establishments in West Germany
German companies established in 1969
German companies disestablished in 2001